"Let Me Know (I Wonder Why Freestyle)" is a song by American rapper Juice Wrld, first released for his EP, JuiceWrld 9 9 9 (2017). Due to its viral spread on TikTok and the growing popularity of its artist, the song was re-released by Grade A Productions and Interscope Records on December 7, 2019. It was the last song released by Juice Wrld before his death a day later, and is featured on the soundtrack of the video game NBA 2K21.

Composition 
The song features "foreboding bass tones emblematic of Chicago's drill scene", accompanying Juice Wrld lamenting a girl who left him, while also asking about her and hoping she will come back to him.

Charts

Certifications

References 

2017 songs
2019 singles
Juice Wrld songs
Songs written by Juice Wrld
Songs written by Nick Mira
Interscope Records singles